Andrew Cary Powell (born 15 May 1973) is an Australian politician.  He was first elected for the seat of Glass House to the Queensland Parliament for the Liberal National Party of Queensland at the 2009 Queensland election.

Early life 
Powell was born in Melbourne, but moved to Sydney while in primary school and later to Queensland. He received a Bachelor of Science and a Bachelor of Arts from the University of Queensland in 1995, and a Certificate III in Public Administration from the Department of Defence in 1996. He became a public servant with the Commonwealth Department of Defence (1996–2000) before spending a year as a short-term missionary in Fiji and New Zealand. When he returned, he re-entered the public service in the Queensland Department of the Premier and Cabinet (2001–04) and then Child Safety (2005–09).

Political career
In the 2009 Queensland state election, he was elected to the Legislative Assembly of Queensland for the seat of Glass House, representing the Liberal National Party.

Member of Parliament 
As the Shadow Minister for the Environment in 2011, Powell's environmental policies were ranked 'negative' on all four areas assessed by a collection of five environmental interest groups, including Queensland Conservation and the Australian Marine Conservation Society. When sent the initial reports by these groups and asked for feedback, Powell declined to respond.

After retaining his seat with an increased majority at the 2012 Queensland state election, Powell was sworn in as Minister for the Environment and Heritage Protection in the Newman ministry on 3 April 2012.

In 2014 as the environment minister, he advised Australians to boycott the American ice-cream company Ben & Jerry's, saying they had damaged the reputation of the Great Barrier Reef and jeopardised jobs and tourism dollars.

Land clearing, although on a downward trend under the previous Bligh Ministry, increased substantially during Powell's tenure as Environment Minister. Data from the Queensland Government's Statewide Landcover and Trees Study (SLATS) shows a grand total of nearly 1.2 million hectares of land was cleared.

Powell retained his seat in the 2015 Queensland state election, with a 2.5% swing towards him in the 2017 Queensland state election, but lost his ministerial responsibilities as a result of the election of the Palaszczuk Labor Government.

References

1973 births
Living people
Liberal National Party of Queensland politicians
Members of the Queensland Legislative Assembly
Australian public servants
University of Queensland alumni
21st-century Australian politicians